Route 141 is a bus route that operates between Nottingham and Sutton-in-Ashfield.

In early July 2022, Trent Barton announced that it would stop running route 141 in September. However, later in the month it was announced that Nottinghamshire County Council would subsidise the service for a year and would tender the route with local bus operators. On 18 August 2022, it was announced that Stagecoach would take over the route on 5 September.

The service operates hourly between Nottingham, Hucknall, Mansfield, and Sutton-in-Ashfield. It formerly continued to Clay Cross.

References 

Bus routes in England
Transport in Nottinghamshire